Ayema Football Club is a football club in Porto-Novo, Benin. They currently play in the Benin Premier League.

Stadium
Currently the team plays at the 3,000 capacity Stade Saint-Louis.

External links
Soccerway

Football clubs in Benin